Stave Lake is a lake and reservoir for the production of hydroelectricity in the Stave River system, located on the northern edge of the District of Mission, about  east of Vancouver, British Columbia, Canada. Prior to construction of the dam, the lake was about one-third the size of its current main arm.

The Stave River, the traditional territory of the Skayuks, a vanished Halqemeylem-speaking Coast Salish people related to today's Sto:lo, was a productive salmon river. The presence of large red cedar trees attracted lumber companies, notably Stave Lake Cedar, whose mill was a mile above the damsite. The lower portion of the Stave is called Hayward Lake, formed by Ruskin Dam and formerly a canyon similar to Capilano and Lynn Canyons, and at its head in the grounds of the one-time community of worker's housing, there is a recreation area there and the beginning of a lakeside trail using the right-of-way of a railway line.

Climate
Stave Lake has an oceanic climate (Köppen climate type Cfb).

Dams 

The Stave Falls Power Company, later a subsidiary of the British Columbia Electric Railway, dammed the river in the 1920-22 period. The Stave Falls Dam and Powerhouse, bunkhouses, a community hall, a large workers' community and railway, known as the Stave Falls Branch, were part of these projects. As a result the Upper Stave was raised and flooded the forests, as was also the case later with Hayward Lake, which was formed by the completion of Ruskin Dam and Powerhouse in 1930. The cedar stood in the river for years, though during the 1980s and 1990s the timber been reclaimed by work crews from a prison camp near Sayres Lake (Cedar Lake), adjacent to the opening from the main arm, by prolonged lowerings of the reservoir level to allow for timber extraction.

After the dam was built, logging lines used the right of way and logged further north into the Stave Valley. The film We're No Angels was partly filmed at the Stave Dam complex, with a large fake town and impressive (and real) timber cathedral built on pilings into Stave Lake.  The whole set was dismantled, although a gazebo-type bandstand was moved to the Hayward Lake Recreation Site just below Stave dam.

Neighbours 

Most property neighbouring Stave Lake is controlled by BC Hydro.  A small number of private cabins are present on the east shores and Zajac Ranch, a summer camp for children with special needs, is on the south west side of the lake.  Access to the east side of the lake is available via Sylvester Road.  A large raft can be seen on Google's satellite image at coordinates 49.309144,-122.320021 which floats around the lake during the summer months.

Recreation 

Stave Lake is a popular 4x4 and dirt-biking location because of its extensive mud flats to the southwest.

References

External links
Bulletin 48: Landforms of British Columbia, A Physiographic Outline, Plate XIIB, Coast Mountains, Pacific Ranges, Looking down the valley of Tingle Creek to Stave Lake - Mount Robie Reid is just right of the mouth of Tingle Creek, Mount Baker is in the distance.

Mission, British Columbia
Lakes of the Lower Mainland
Reservoirs in British Columbia
Garibaldi Ranges
New Westminster Land District